Yale Atlético Clube, usually called Yale, was one of the first sports club in Belo Horizonte, Minas Gerais, Brazil.

History
Founded on 7 August 1910, by Italian immigrants, the club supplied the city with many different sport teams, one of them was football. They played in the Campeonato de Belo Horizonte (Belo Horizonte Championship) – which is now the Campeonato Mineiro – until 1925, that's the year it gave up football.

Yale eventually split and part of it became the Palestra Itália of Minas, a team which was created to compete with many of the bigger teams in Belo Horizonte like America, Atlético, and Yale itself. Yale's separation into the Palestra caused many of Yale's footballers to join the Palestra a team which later became Cruzeiro. In conclusion it can be said that the team that was once Yale became the Cruzeiro of today.

References

Cruzeiro Esporte Clube
Association football clubs established in 1910
Sports teams in Belo Horizonte
Defunct football clubs in Minas Gerais
Association football clubs disestablished in 1930
1910 establishments in Brazil
Diaspora football clubs in Brazil
Italian association football clubs outside Italy